Isaac H. Edgett (March 13, 1838 – March 9, 1917) was an American civil servant and politician who served as the acting Massachusetts Secretary of the Commonwealth.

Early life
Edgett was born in Hillsborough, New Brunswick on March 13, 1838, to Handyside P. and Ruth Edgett.   Edgett married Elizabeth Boden Fiske, b. April 19, 1841.

Military service
Edgett joined up with the Twenty-Third Massachusetts Volunteer Infantry early in the American Civil War. He was wounded at the Battle of Cold Harbor. He was mustered out at the end of the war with the rank of captain.

Massachusetts Secretary of the Commonwealth
Edgett, worked as the First Deputy to Secretary of the Commonwealth's office for 37 years, retiring in 1913.  As the First Deputy Secretary of the Commonwealth Edgett became the acting Massachusetts Secretary of the Commonwealth upon  the death of William M. Olin.  Edgett served as the acting Massachusetts Secretary of the Commonwealth   until Albert P. Langtry was elected by the Massachusetts legislature to serve out the remainder of Olin's term.

References

External links

1838 births
Secretaries of the Commonwealth of Massachusetts
1917 deaths
Massachusetts Republicans
Massachusetts city council members
People of Massachusetts in the American Civil War
People from Beverly, Massachusetts
Burials in Massachusetts
19th-century American politicians